This list of pizza chains includes notable pizzerias and pizza chains. Pizza is a dish of Neapolitan origin and cuisine, made with an oven-baked, flat, generally round bread that is often covered with tomatoes or a tomato-based sauce and mozzarella cheese. Other toppings are added according to region, culture, or personal preference.

A restaurant or takeout where pizzas are made and sold as main food is called a pizzeria or simply “pizza parlor” in English. The term pizza pie is a (mainly American) dialectal, and pie is used for simplicity in some contexts, such as among pizzeria staff.

International chains

US based
see also article: List of pizza chains of the United States

 California Pizza Kitchen
 Chuck E. Cheese
 Domino's Pizza
 Little Caesars
 Papa John's Pizza
 Pizza Hut
 Pizza Inn
 Sbarro
 Shakey's Pizza
 Uno Pizzeria & Grill

Canada, Europe and Asia
 Boston Pizza
 Dodo Pizza
 Figaro's Pizza
 Sarpino's Pizzeria
 Telepizza
 The Pizza Company
 PizzaExpress
 Pizza Corner (owned now by Caesars Pizza)
 Pizza Pizza
 Vapiano
 Yellow Cab Pizza

Pizzerias by country of origin

Australia

 Pizza Capers
 La Porchetta

Brazil
 Mister Pizza

Canada

 241 Pizza
 Boston Pizza
 Freshslice Pizza
 Gabriel Pizza
 Greco Pizza Restaurant
 King of Donair
 Mikes
 Mother's Pizza
 Panago
 Pizza 73
 Pizza Delight
 Pizza Nova
 Pizzaiolo
 Pizza Pizza
 Topper's Pizza

China
 Kro's Nest
 Origus

Colombia
 Jeno's Pizza

Finland

 Kotipizza

France
 Speed Rabbit Pizza

Germany
 Vapiano

India
 Smokin' Joes

Ireland
 Four Star Pizza
 Apache Pizza

Israel
 Big Apple Pizza

Italy
 Rossopomodoro
 Spizzico

Japan
 Aoki's Pizza
 Pizza California
 Pizza-La

Lithuania

 Čili

Mexico
 Benedetti's Pizza

Netherlands
New York Pizza

New Zealand
 Hell Pizza

Norway
 Peppes Pizza

Philippines

 Greenwich Pizza
 Yellow Cab Pizza

Russia
 Dodo Pizza
 New York Pizza

South Africa
 Debonairs Pizza
 Panarottis
 Roman's Pizza

South Korea

 Mr. Pizza

Spain
 Telepizza

Taiwan
 Alleycat's Pizza

Thailand
 The Pizza Company

Trinidad and Tobago
 Mario's Pizzeria

Ukraine
 Pizza Celentano

United Kingdom

 Ask
 Bella Italia
 Carluccio's
 easyPizza
 Franco Manca
 PizzaExpress
 Prezzo
 Strada
 Tops Pizza
 Zizzi

See also

 List of pizza franchises
 List of casual dining restaurant chains
 List of coffeehouse chains
 List of fast food restaurant chains
 List of ice cream parlor chains
 Lists of restaurants

References

Pizza chains